Events from the year 1764 in Wales.

Incumbents
Lord Lieutenant of Anglesey - Sir Nicholas Bayly, 2nd Baronet
Lord Lieutenant of Brecknockshire and Lord Lieutenant of Monmouthshire – Thomas Morgan
Lord Lieutenant of Caernarvonshire - Thomas Wynn
Lord Lieutenant of Cardiganshire – Wilmot Vaughan, 1st Earl of Lisburne
Lord Lieutenant of Carmarthenshire – George Rice
Lord Lieutenant of Denbighshire - Richard Myddelton  
Lord Lieutenant of Flintshire - Sir Roger Mostyn, 5th Baronet 
Lord Lieutenant of Glamorgan – Other Windsor, 4th Earl of Plymouth
Lord Lieutenant of Merionethshire - William Vaughan
Lord Lieutenant of Montgomeryshire – Henry Herbert, 1st Earl of Powis 
Lord Lieutenant of Pembrokeshire – Sir William Owen, 4th Baronet
Lord Lieutenant of Radnorshire – Howell Gwynne

Bishop of Bangor – John Egerton
Bishop of Llandaff – John Ewer
Bishop of St Asaph – Richard Newcome
Bishop of St Davids – Samuel Squire

Events
January - South Wales industrialist Anthony Bacon succeeds John Wilkes as MP for Aylesbury.
February - Thomas Nowell, the new principal of St Mary Hall, Oxford, marries Sarah Munday, daughter of the Mayor of Oxford.
21 June - Humphrey Edwards begins a voyage round the world as physician on the frigate Tamar.

Arts and literature

New books

English language
Rowland Jones - The Origin of Language and Nations
Gabriel Powell - Survey of Gower

Welsh language
Evan Evans (Ieuan Fardd) - Some Specimens of the Poetry of the Antient Welsh Bards
David Powell - Sail yr Athrawiaeth Gatholic
Morgan Rhys - Golwg o Ben Nebo

Music
31 March - "Jones" performs on the Welsh harp at a benefit concert in Dublin, "in the true Spirit and Taste peculiar to the Genius of his Country".

Births
29 April - Ann Hatton ("Ann of Swansea"), English novelist (d. 1838)
20 June - Thomas Evans (Tomos Glyn Cothi), first Unitarian minister in Wales (d. 1833)
20 July - Sir Robert Williams, 9th Baronet, politician (died 1830)
27 July - John Thelwall, English-born orator, writer, political reformer, journalist and poet (died 1834)
date unknown
William Crawshay I, ironmaster (d. 1834)
Robert Waithman, lord mayor of London (d. 1833)

Deaths
17 March - Uvedale Tomkins Price, politician, Steward of the Courts for Denbigh, 78
18 June - Christmas Samuel, minister and writer, 90
22 June - Sir John Philipps, 6th Baronet, 63
26 September - Joseph Harris, Assay-master of the Royal Mint, 60
October - Richard Lathrop, bookseller and printer, age unknown
date unknown - John Richards, preacher and poet, about 44

References

Wales
Wales